The Commonwealth Tenpin Bowling Championships is an event open to all national World Bowling member federations, which participate in tenpin bowling and are countries within the Commonwealth or all national tenpin bowling federations and/or associations (Non-WB) who are within the Commonwealth and participate in tenpin bowling. Eligible members send two men and two women to compete for medals in Singles, Doubles, Mixed Doubles, Team, All-Events, and Masters.

Commonwealth Tenpin Bowling Federation
The CTBF was founded on August 28, 2002, in Stirling, Scotland. CTBF was created to foster a greater and more focused interest in tenpin bowling and international friendship between all nations within the Commonwealth. The CTBF will affiliate to the sport's international governing body, World Bowling, with its prime focus being to successfully stage Commonwealth Championships that will ultimately meld into the official Commonwealth Games program.

History

Stirling 2002
The inaugural Commonwealth Tenpin Bowling Championships were held in Stirling, Scotland. England won seven out of a possible ten gold medals. Donna Adams won gold in singles, all-events, masters, mixed doubles, and team. India's Shaik Abdul Hameed won two gold medals, in singles and masters.

Paphos 2005
The second Commonwealth Tenpin Bowling Championships were held in Paphos, Cyprus. Malaysia won six out of a possible ten gold medals. Shalin Zulkifli won gold in all-events, masters, mixed doubles, and team.

Melbourne 2006
The third Commonwealth Tenpin Bowling Championships were held in Melbourne, Australia. England won five gold medals, but Australia won the most medals, with eleven (three gold, four silver, and four bronze). England's Fiona Banks won gold in doubles, masters, and mixed doubles.

Belfast 2008
The fourth Commonwealth Tenpin Bowling Championships were held in Belfast, Northern Ireland. England and Malaysia each won four gold medals, with Singapore winning the remaining two gold medals.

Kuala Lumpur 2011
The fifth Commonwealth Tenpin Bowling Championships were held in Kuala Lumpur, Malaysia. Three nations dominated this edition, with Singapore winning four gold medals and three each for England and Malaysia.

Auckland 2013
The sixth Commonwealth Tenpin Bowling Championships were held in Auckland, New Zealand. Australia won four gold medals, three by Sam Cooley in singles, all-events, and masters.

Johannesburg 2016
The seventh Commonwealth Tenpin Bowling Championships were held in Johannesburg, South Africa from November 19–27. Malaysia won seven of the ten events and led the medal tally with 13 (7 gold, 5 silver, 1 bronze). Malaysia's Muhammad Nur Aiman won four gold medals (Singles, All-Events, Masters, Mixed Team Event) and a silver medal (Doubles).

Medal History

References

External links
 Commonwealth Championships Results page from European Tenpin Bowling Federation
 Bowlingdigital's Commonwealth Tenpin Bowling Federation Section

Ten-pin bowling competitions
Tenpin Bowling